Amanda Township is one of the seventeen townships of Hancock County, Ohio, United States. As of the 2010 census, the township population was 1,024, 665 of whom lived in the unincorporated portions of the township.

Geography
Located in the eastern part of the county, it borders the following townships:
Biglick Township – north
Ridge Township, Wyandot County – east
Richland Township, Wyandot County – southeast
Delaware Township – southwest
Jackson Township – west
Marion Township – northwest

The village of Vanlue is located in northeastern Amanda Township.

Name and history
Statewide, other Amanda Townships are located in Allen and Fairfield counties.

Amanda Township was first settled on February 25, 1822, by Thomas Thompson. Thompson built a cabin in 1823 and planted the township's first crop that year. He brought his family to the township from Pickaway County in 1824. In 1829, Thompson became Hancock County's first Justice of the Peace. Thompson lived in Amanda Township until his death in Vanlue on October 26, 1873.

Government
The township is governed by a three-member board of trustees, who are elected in November of odd-numbered years to a four-year term beginning on the following January 1. Two are elected in the year after the presidential election and one is elected in the year before it. There is also an elected township fiscal officer, who serves a four-year term beginning on April 1 of the year after the election, which is held in November of the year before the presidential election. Vacancies in the fiscal officership or on the board of trustees are filled by the remaining trustees.

References

External links

Townships in Hancock County, Ohio
Townships in Ohio